The Suffolk Women's cricket team is the women's representative cricket team for the English historic county of Suffolk. They play their home games at various grounds across the county, including Wamil Way, Mildenhall and Woolpit CC, Woolpit. They are captained by Natalie Samuels. In 2019, they played in Division Three of the final season of the Women's County Championship, and have since competed in the Women's Twenty20 Cup. They are partnered with the regional side Sunrisers.

History
Suffolk Women joined the county system in 2007, competing in the County Challenge Cup, the lower tier of the Women's County Championship, in which they lost all three of their games. The next few seasons saw similarly poor performances, but the team improved from 2011 onwards, and Suffolk topped Division 4 North & East for three consecutive seasons in 2012, 2013 and 2014, missing out on promotion in play-offs in the first two instances, before finally achieving Division 3 status in 2014, beating Cornwall in a play-off by 61 runs. However, Suffolk were relegated in 2015 and have since only played in the lowest tier of the Championship, missing out on promotion in a play-off once again in 2018.

In the Women's Twenty20 Cup, Suffolk have similarly played in the lower tiers of the competition, but did manage to gain promotion to Division South 2 in 2011, and in 2016 they topped Division 4A, going through the season unbeaten. In 2021, they competed in the East Group of the Twenty20 Cup, finishing 3rd with 4 victories. Suffolk batter Imogen Sidhu was the leading run-scorer across the whole competition, with 293 runs including 4 half-centuries. In 2022, they won their group of the Twenty20 Cup, finishing second in the initial group stage before beating Cambridgeshire and Essex on the group Finals Day to emerge victorious. They also began competing in the East of England Women's County Championship in 2022, and won the competition, winning five of their six matches.

Players

Current squad
Based on appearances in the 2022 season.

Seasons

Women's County Championship

Women's Twenty20 Cup

Honours
 Women's Twenty20 Cup:
 Group winners (1) – 2022

See also
 Suffolk County Cricket Club
 Sunrisers (women's cricket)

References

Cricket in Suffolk
Women's cricket teams in England